The 1992 Derby City Council election took place on 7 May 1992 to elect members of Derby City Council in England. Local elections were held in the United Kingdom in 1992. This was on the same day as other local elections. 14 of the council's 44 seats were up for election. No seats changed hands and the council remained under no overall control, with the Conservatives and Labour holding exactly half the seats each.

Overall results

|-
| colspan=2 style="text-align: right; margin-right: 1em" | Total
| style="text-align: right;" | 14
| colspan=5 |
| style="text-align: right;" | 50,758
| style="text-align: right;" |

Ward results

Abbey

Allestree

Alvaston

Babington

Blagreaves

Boulton

Breadsall

Chaddesden

Chellaston

Darley

Derwent

Kingsway

Litchurch

Spondon

References

1992 English local elections
May 1992 events
1992
1990s in Derbyshire